In continuum physics, materials with memory, also referred as materials with hereditary effects are a class of materials whose constitutive equations contains a dependence upon the past history of thermodynamic, kinetic, electromagnetic or other kind of state variables.

Historical notes
The study of these materials arises from the pioneering articles of Ludwig Boltzmann and Vito Volterra, in which they sought an extension of the concept of an elastic material. In general, in materials with memory the local value of some constitutive quantity (stress, heat flux, electric current, polarization and magnetization, etc.) at a time  depends upon the history of the state variables (deformation, temperature, electric and magnetic fields, etc.). The hypothesis that the remote history of a variable has less influence than its values in the recent past, was stated in modern continuum mechanics as the fading memory principle by Bernard Coleman and Walter Noll.
This assumption was implicit in the pioneer works: when restricted to cyclic hystories, it traces back to the closed cycle principle stated by Volterra, which leads to a constitutive relation of integral convolution type.
In the linear case, this relation takes the form of a Volterra equation

Constitutive relations of materials with memory
In the linear case, this relation takes the form of a Volterra equation

See also

Biomaterial
Biomechanics
Dielectric relaxation
Hysteresis
Rheology
Viscosity
Viscoelasticity
Viscoplasticity

Notes

References

Articles
.
 (online version ).
.
. In this paper, written only few years after the discovery of the effect itself, Dario Graffi proposes a theory of the Luxemburg effect based on Volterra's theory of hereditary phenomena.
 (online version ).
 (online version ). In this paper, Graffi introduces the free energy now called Graffi–Volterra free energy after him.
.  is a short survey on the determination of the response functions of materials with memory by acoustical measurements.
.  is a note on fading memory principle.
.
. "The work of Vito Volterra on hereditary phenomena and some of their consequences" is an ample technical survey paper on the research work of Vito Volterra on hereditary phenomena in mathematical physics.
. An introduction to modern rational continuum mechanics by one of its leading contributors.
 (online version ). G. Del Piero, L. Deseri (1997); "", Arch. Rational Mech. Anal. 138, 1–35.

Books
.
.
 (also available as e-book with ).
.
.
 (available also as e-book with ).
.
.

 (see also ).
 (see also : the JFM reviews refer to the original 1930 English edition).

Congress proceedings and collections of articles on materials with memory

Materials science
Non-Newtonian fluids
Rubber properties
Continuum mechanics
Elasticity (physics)
Classical mechanics
Electrodynamics